Zou Yan (5 November 1915 – 1 April 2022) was a founding major general (shaojiang) of the People's Liberation Army (PLA). He was a representative of the 9th, 11th, 12th, 13th National Congress of the Chinese Communist Party, and a member of the 12th Central Commission for Discipline Inspection.

Biography
Zou was born into a family of farming background in Xingguo County, Jiangxi, in 1915.

He enlisted in the Red Army in 1930, and joined the Chinese Communist Party (CCP) in 1935. During the Long March, he was communication foreman of the General Political Department. After graduating from the Central Party School of the Chinese Communist Party, he worked in the Shaanxi-Gansu-Ningxia Border Region and was rated as a model worker in 1942 due to his outstanding achievements in mass production movement. During the Chinese Civil War, he successively served as a political commissar in the Shanxi-Chahar-Hebei Military Region, Mudanjiang Military District, Northeast Field Army, and Fourth Field Army.

After establishment of the Communist State in 1951, he was assigned to the Northeast Public Security Force as deputy political commissar, capturing the CIA spies Donnay and Fecteau. He attained the rank of major general (shaojiang) in 1955. In August 1969, he rose to become deputy political commissar of Shenyang Military Region, and served until December 1980. He retired in 1988.

On 2 April 2022, Yan died in Shenyang, Liaoning, at the age of 106.

References

1915 births
2022 deaths
People from Xingguo County
Central Party School of the Chinese Communist Party alumni
People's Liberation Army generals from Jiangxi
People's Republic of China politicians from Jiangxi
Chinese Communist Party politicians from Jiangxi
Deputy political commissar of the Shenyang Military Region
Chinese centenarians
Men centenarians